Lotta Losten (born 7 November 1981) is a Swedish actress, designer, and photographer. She is best known for her collaborations with her husband David F. Sandberg, including the 2013 short film Lights Out, the 2016 feature film adaptation of the same name, and Shazam!.

Career 
Lotta made her film debut in the short film Cam Closer (2013), about a phone that can see the future. She and her husband, filmmaker David F. Sandberg, created the 2013 short film Lights Out, where she plays a woman who is haunted by a creature that moves in the dark, but does not appear if the lights are on. According to Sandberg, the movie cost practically nothing to make and was originally something they just wanted to have fun with. They submitted the film to the Bloody Cuts Horror Challenge where the film was a finalist, and Sandberg won Best Director. Some months later, the short film became popular online, going from about 8000 views to over a million, and attracting Hollywood directors and producers.

Since 2014, Losten has starred in several short films including See You Soon (2014), Pictured (2014), Not So Fast (2014), Coffer (2014), Attic Panic (2015) and  Closet Space (2016). In the feature film of Lights Out, released in 2016, she plays Esther, the co-worker in the opening scene who encounters Diana Walter. She also has a small role in Shazam! (2019).

Personal life 
Losten was born in Jönköping, Sweden. She has been married to director David F. Sandberg since 2013. She studied theatre history and gender studies at Lund University and studied acting at Blekinge läns folkhögskola for two years.

Filmography

Short films

Feature films

References

External links
 
 

1981 births
Living people
People from Jönköping
Swedish film actresses
Swedish women photographers